(Four motets on Gregorian themes), Op. 10, are four sacred motets composed by Maurice Duruflé in 1960, based on Gregorian themes. He set Ubi caritas et amor, Tota pulchra es, Tu es Petrus and Tantum ergo.

History 
Maurice Duruflé composed the four motets in 1960, based on Gregorian themes, as he had done before in his Requiem of 1948. He set Latin texts, scored for unaccompanied voices: a mixed choir in Nos. 1, 3 and 4, and a women's choir in No. 2. Duruflé dedicated the work to Auguste Le Guennant, the director of the Gregorian Institute of Paris. The motets were published in 1960 by Éditions Durand, Duruflé's primary publisher. The motets were first performed on 4 May 1961 at the church of Saint-Merri in Paris by the Chorale Stéphane Caillat.

Structure, texts and music 
The four motets set Latin texts for different liturgical occasions:
 Ubi caritas et amor
 Tota pulchra es
 Tu es Petrus
 Tantum ergo

The text for the first motet is Ubi caritas et amor ("Where charity and love are"), an antiphon for Maundy Thursday. Tota pulchra es ("Thou art all fair") is a text from Vespers for the Marian Feast of the Immaculate Conception. The last motet is based on Tantum ergo, the conclusion of the Pange lingua by St. Thomas Aquinas.

In the four motets, Duruflé based his music on Gregorian chant. He combines the chant lines with a polyphonic setting. The chant is always present in one or more voices. The music has been described as "rich in subtle harmonies, well-written for voices, and reminiscent of impressionism". A reviewer notes: "Here Duruflé shows his particular genius for invoking the spiritual element of plainsong in a polyphonic context, achieving a suppleness of rhythm alongside strong characterization of each text."

Recordings 
In recordings, the motets are often combined with Duruflé's Requiem, sharing the same approach of polyphonic music based on Gregorian chant. They have been recorded for example by King's College Choir, conducted by Stephen Cleobury and the Corydon Singers conducted by Matthew Best. On recordings, as in the liturgy, single movements have been performed to match a context. The Cambridge Singers, conducted by John Rutter, performed Ubi caritas in a collection This is the Day of music on royal occasions, while the Westminster Abbey Choir, conducted by James O'Donnell, performed Tu es Petrus for an album The Feast of Saint Peter the Apostle at Westminster Abbey. 
The Houston Chamber Choir's recording, Duruflé: Complete Choral Works won the award for Best Choral Performance at the 62nd Annual GRAMMY Awards in January 2020.

References

Bibliography

External links 
 Duruflé: Quatre Motets sur des thèmes grégoriens, Op. 10 Prestoclassical
 M. Duruflé – Quatre motets sur des thèmes grégoriens on Choralia
 Quatre motets sur des thèmes grégoriens on data.bnf.fr
 Quatre Motets Sur Des Thèmes Grégoriens, by Maurice Duruflé on YouTube

Compositions by Maurice Duruflé
Motets
Catholic music
1960 compositions